Antonio Veneziano  (1543 - 19 August 1593) was an Italian poet who wrote mainly in the Sicilian language. He is considered among the greatest poets who wrote in Sicilian, which include Giovanni Meli, Domenico Tempio and Nino Martoglio.  He is perhaps the first major figure in Sicilian literature following the Sicilian School which predates him by three centuries.  During his lifetime, he was well known for his poetry both within Sicily and far beyond.  He also wrote in Italian and Latin.

Veneziano was born in Monreale, a contemporary of the great Spanish writer Miguel de Cervantes (Sicily was under Spanish rule at this time).  As it happens, both shared a cell after being captured by Barbary pirates around 1575.  He wrote his greatest work, Celia during his period of imprisonment in Algeria (he was released in 1579).  Cervantes is reported as having said that Veneziano had earned a passage to Paradise through this collection of poems  (Celia means a jest or joke in both Sicilian and Italian).  He wrote other works of poetry, also delving in satire and bawdy rhymes. He died in Palermo.

When once asked why he chose to write in Sicilian rather than a recognised literary language such as Italian or Spanish, he replied to the effect that if a man is to seduce a woman, he must do so in her mother tongue.  It is unclear whether a pun was intended.

The whole of his works were assembled in 1967 in a publication entitled: Ottave, edited by A. Rigoli.

Examples of his poetry

Some extracts from his collection,  Celia, appear below (circa 1575 - 1580).  While the subject matter of the first poem, love, is typical enough of early Sicilian poetry, the second is a bit more atypical, possessing a whimsical quality.

No. vii

No. viii

References 

 Arba Sicula Volume II, 1980 (bilingual: Sicilian and English) - source of the examples of poetry and English translation.

1543 births
1593 deaths
People from Monreale
Sicilian-language poets
Italian male poets
Writers from the Province of Palermo